The International VELUX Award challenges students of architecture to explore the theme of sunlight and daylight. The award is biennial and was first presented in 2004.

The award celebrates excellence in completed works on any scale from a small scale component to large urban contexts or abstract concepts and experimentation. The award is presented by VELUX in close cooperation with the International Union of Architects (UIA) and the European Association for Architectural Education (EAAE).

Description 
“Light of Tomorrow” is the theme of the International VELUX Award. The award wants to challenge the future of daylight in the built environment. The award contains no specific categories and is in no way restricted to the use of VELUX products. The jury of the International VELUX Award comprises internationally recognized architects and other building professionals. Any registered student of architecture – individual or team – from all over the world may participate in the award. The award wants to acknowledge not only the students but their teachers as well. Therefore, all students must be backed and granted submission by a teacher from a school of architecture.

History 
The first International VELUX Award took place in 2004. 760 students from 194 schools in 34 countries in Europe registered, and 258 students from 106 schools in 27 countries submitted their projects. The international jury led by Glenn Murcutt selected three winners and eight honourable mentions, who were announced at the Award event held in Paris.

2004 winners 
In 2004 the first prize went to Norwegian student Claes Heske Ekornås for his project “Light as matter”. In 2004, ten winners were announced at the Award event in Paris.

2006 winners 
In 2006, the award went global – inviting students from all over the world to participate. The number of submissions more than doubled reaching 557 projects from 225 schools in 53 countries. The international jury led by Per Olaf Fjeld decided to award three winners and 17 honourable mentions, and they were all celebrated at the Award event at the Guggenheim Museum in Bilbao, Spain.

Louise Groenlund of Denmark won the International VELUX Award for her project ”A museum of photography”. Twenty winners and honourable mentions were announced at the Award event at the Guggenheim Bilbao in November 2006.

2008 winners 
In 2008, the award received 686 projects, representing 244 schools of architecture in 46 countries. The international jury led by jury chairman Hani Rashid of Asymptote Architecture decided to award three winners and eight honourable mentions, who were celebrated at the Pisani Palace in Venice in November 2008.

The jury appointed three prize winners and eight honourable mentions. Reilly O’Neil Hogan from Cornell University, USA, won first prize for his project “Embodied Ephemerality”. Ruan Hau and Xiong Xing from Tsinghua University in Beijing won second prize for their project ”Interface repairing – Light Festival”. Dean Carlo MacGregor from Lusíada University in Lisbon, Portugal, won third prize for his project “Light has a body”.

2010 winners 
In 2010, the award represented more countries than ever before. There were 673 entries from 280 schools in 55 countries. The international jury led by jury chairman Magda Mostafa decided to award three winners and eight honourable mentions. They were celebrated at the award event on 6 October 2010 in La Rochelle, France.

The jury appointed three prize winners and eight honourable mentions. Young-Gook Park, Kim Dea Hyun, Choi Jin Kyu and Kim Won Ill from Hanyang University, South Korea, won the first prize for their project Constellation of Light Field. Ma Xin, Wang Rui and Yang Meng from the Architecture School of Tianjin University, China, won the second prize for their project Condensation of Variational Sunlight Influences. Joe Wu from Delft University of Technology, TU Delft, the Netherlands, also won the second prize for his project Lightscape between gaps.

2016 winners 
The five regional winners of Daylight in Buildings were:

Africa: Shelter.Light by Fatai Osundiji, Emmanuel Ayoloto, Nigeria
The Americas: No parking..Let there be light by Enzo Piero Vergara Vaccia, Chile
Asia & Oceania: REDISTRIBUTION OF LIGHT by Kwang Hoon Lee, Hyuk Sung Kwon, Yu Min Park, Republic of Korea
Eastern Europe & the Middle East: Light Scattering Window by Kamil Głowacki, Marta Sowińska, Łukasz Gąska, Poland
Western Europe: Ceremonial Room Copenhagen by Eskild Pedersen, Denmark

The five regional winners of Daylight Investigations were:

Africa: Light and Shadow by Ahmed Zorgui, Ala Eddin Noumi, Tunesia
The Americas: Automated Blind Study by Amir Nezamdoost, Alen Mahic, Malak Modaresnezhad, USA
Asia & Oceania: Light for the blind by Jiafeng Li, Chenlu Wang, Guiding Yao, Jiebei Yang, Lushan Ao, Xiaoqi Chen and Jiawen Li, China
Eastern Europe & the Middle East: A quenchless light by Anna Andronova, Russia
Western Europe: Hammershøi's Grammar by Nicholas Shurey, Denmark

2018 winners 
The four regional winners of Daylight Investigations were:

The Americas: Daylight to Water by John Nguyen, Stephen Baik, Abubaker Bajaman, Canada
Asia & Oceania: Road to Light by Yuhan Luo, Di Lan, Yusong Liu, China
Eastern Europe & the Middle East: Cloud of the Polar Light by Anna Borisova, Kamilla Akhmetova, Russia
Western Europe: Cover to Reveal by Brice Lemaire, Xialan Vandendries, Julien Obedia, Belgium

The five regional winners of Daylight in Buildings were:

Africa: Light Pavilion by Fatai Osundiji, Emmanuel Ayo-loto, Nigeria
The Americas: Light Liquefaction by Ziqi Chen, Shuaizhong Wang, Zeyu Liu, USA
Asia & Oceania: My Dead Relative in the Light by Qi Wang, Jingkai Chen, Peilin Yin, China
Eastern Europe & the Middle East: Light Forms Juggler by Anastasia Maslova, Russia
Western Europe: Reaching the Light by Joana Robalo, João Umbelino, Ana Ázar, António Lopes, Miguel Pedro, Portugal

References

External links 
 Official website
 Velux official website
 Site containing information about daylight and architecture
 A website for students of architecture worldwide sponsored by VELUX
 A magazine about daylight and architecture
 Atelier Bow-Wow
 Will Bruder and Partners Ltd
 MVRDV
 3XN

Architecture awards
Architectural competitions
Architectural education